Dungeons & Dragons Insider (DDI) was Wizards of the Coast's subscription method of digitally delivering periodic content and information about Dungeons & Dragons to the game's players from 2007 to 2017.

History
DDI was announced at the 2007 Gen Con as a subscription-based electronic supplement to Dungeons & Dragons. The demo included a short video of a virtual "dungeon" (called the Game Table) in which some D&D adventures take place, containing virtual miniatures based on your character as created in the Character Visualizer (a 3D full-body portrait program).

A DDI subscription included an online character builder (which required the now-defunct Microsoft Silverlight), archived Dragon and Dungeon web content, and a compendium of rules elements for the 4th edition of Dungeons & Dragons. Additionally, a beta version of a monster builder (as part of the Adventure Tools suite) and the Virtual Table were released.

It remained unclear if the Character Visualizer was slated for completion as originally advertised. This caused some degree of backlash within the customer base, as this tool (and the currently-in-beta Virtual Table) were scheduled to launch when the 4th edition core books were released mid-2008; an additional source of anger was the litigious approach of Wizards of the Coast towards third-party developers who created tools to fill the gaps left by these unreleased tools.

An August 2014 subscription renewal email from Wizards of the Coast indicate that DDI subscription would no longer include new issues of Dragon and Dungeon magazines (only archives), and the online resources would no longer be actively supported. In 2017, Wizards of the Coast announced similar online tool-set for 5th Edition D&D dubbed D&D Beyond.

See also
 List of role-playing game software

References

Dungeons & Dragons